This is a list of towns and villages in the ceremonial county of Rutland, England.

A
Ashwell
Ayston

B
Barleythorpe
Barrow
Barrowden
Beaumont Chase
Belmesthorpe
Belton-in-Rutland
Bisbrooke
Braunston-in-Rutland
Brooke
Burley

C
Caldecott
Clipsham
Cottesmore

E
Edith Weston
Egleton
Empingham
Essendine
Exton

G
Glaston
Great Casterton
Greetham
Gunthorpe

H
Hambleton
Horn

K
Ketton

L
Langham
Leighfield
Little Casterton
Lyddington
Lyndon

M
Manton
Market Overton
Martinsthorpe
Morcott

N
Normanton
North Luffenham

O
Oakham

P
Pickworth
Pilton
Preston

R
Ridlington
Ryhall

S
Seaton
South Luffenham
Stoke Dry
Stretton

T
Teigh
Thistleton
Thorpe by Water
Tickencote
Tinwell
Tixover

U
Uppingham

W
Wardley
Whissendine
Whitwell
Wing

See also
List of settlements in Rutland by population
List of places in England

Rutland
 
Places